Saskatchewan River Forks refers to the area in Canada where the North Saskatchewan and South Saskatchewan rivers merge to create the Saskatchewan River. The province of Saskatchewan maintains the Saskatchewan Forks Recreation Site, on the west side of the fork, which is heavily wooded, and features steep banks, a tourist picnic site and hiking trails.

North American fur trade posts were of importance to European traders. Englishman Henry Kelsey, working for the Hudson's Bay Company, reached this point in 1692 but did not establish a fort. A New France fur-trading post, Fort La Jonquière, was established on the Saskatchewan or its branches in 1751 by Jacques Legardeur de Saint-Pierre, possibly at or near the forks. In 1753 a second French fur-trading post, Fort de la Corne, was established in the area by Louis de la Corne, Chevalier de la Corne.

A major intersection when waterways were important to transportation on the Canadian prairies, first with the fur trade and then during the riverboat era, today the forks attract tourists, canoeists and recreational fishermen.

See also
 Fort de la Corne
 Weldon, Saskatchewan

References

External links
 http://wikimapia.org/937546/ - WikiMapia site showing aerial view of the Saskatchewan River Forks.

Saskatchewan River
North Saskatchewan River
South Saskatchewan River
Geography of Saskatchewan